Awa Province may refer to:
 Awa Province (Chiba) (安房国) in modern-day Chiba Prefecture
 Awa Province (Tokushima) (阿波国) in modern-day Tokushima Prefecture